Franz Stöckli was a Swiss bobsledder who competed in the early 1950s. He won two bronze medals in the four-man event at the FIBT World Championships, earning them in 1950 and 1951.

References
Bobsleigh four-man world championship medalists since 1930

Possibly living people
Swiss male bobsledders
Year of birth missing
20th-century Swiss people